This is a list of Temple Owls football players in the NFL Draft.

Key

Selections

References

Temple

Temple Owls NFL Draft